Storm Front is a 2000 fantasy novel by American writer Jim Butcher. It is the first novel in The Dresden Files, his first published series, and it follows the character of Harry Dresden, professional wizard. The novel was later adapted into a pilot for a SyFy channel television series.

Plot summary
Dresden is hired by a Monica Sells to find her husband Victor Sells, an amateur occultist who has been acting oddly. Later that day, he gets a call from Lieutenant Karrin Murphy, director of the Special Investigations (SI) Unit of the Chicago Police Department. Murphy's partner shows him the bodies of two people who died by having their hearts ripped out, apparently by magic. Dresden realizes that he could the chief suspect for these magical murders if news of them reaches the White Council.

Eventually, despite encounters with vampires, the unknown warlock, and the ever-suspicious Warden Morgan who does hear of the murders, Dresden learns that the affair centers around the drug "ThreeEye", which allows normal humans to temporarily acquire Wizards Sight, which eventually drives them insane. Victor Sells has been manufacturing ThreeEye to edge out mob boss Johnny Marcone. Using the energy of thunder storms and the orgies held at his home, he powered the spells to remove his enemies, namely Marcone's men and anyone else threatening his operation. His next target becomes Dresden due Dresden's investigation on the matter

Dresden interrupts Victor's spellcasting and attacks him, eventually burning down Victor's house while Victor is still inside grappling with giant scorpions and a demon he had summoned to kill Dresden. Dresden survives, but is himself trapped on the balcony of the burning house until Morgan steps in to rescue him. Morgan had witnessed the fight with Victor and, knowing now that Dresden is innocent, reluctantly testifies on Dresden's behalf to the White Council.

Characters

 Harry Dresden: the protagonist, a professional wizard, and the only one listed in the phone book.  
 Monica Sells: one of Dresden's clients and the wife of Warlock Victor Sells.  
 Lieutenant Karrin Murphy: director of Special Investigations, Chicago PD. 
 Detective Ron Carmichael: Murphy's partner at SI.
 Jennifer Stanton: an employee of the Velvet Room and Monica Sells' sister.
 Tommy Tomm: a bodyguard for Gentleman Johnny Marcone.
 Gentleman Johnny Marcone: the lord of the Chicago underworld.
 Hendricks: a bodyguard for Gentleman Johnny Marcone.
 Spike: a man of Marcone's.
 Mac: the owner and operator of McAnally's tavern.
 Susan Rodriguez: a reporter at the Midwestern Arcane, and Dresden's love interest.
 Toot-Toot: a dewdrop faerie who helps Dresden.
 Warden Donald Morgan: a law enforcement warden for the White Council, who has a mandate to aid the innocent and punish the guilty. 
 Mister: Dresden's 30+ pound house cat.
 Bob: an intelligent air spirit who resides inside a skull in Dresden's sub-basement laboratory.
 Madame Bianca St. Claire: the owner of the Velvet Room and a Red Court vampire. 
 Linda Randall: a former employee of the Velvet Room, the Beckitt's chauffeur, friend and sometime lover to Jennifer Stanton.  
 The Beckitts: a rich couple who provide money for Victor Sells.
 Donny Wise: a photographer for a local adult magazine.
 Victor "Shadowman" Sells: the villain of the novel, who is a warlock and Monica Sells' husband.
 Jenny and Billy Sells: children of Monica and Victor Sells.

In other media
 The plot of the novel was condensed into a 90-minute prospective television pilot for the Sci Fi Channel, and edited and aired as a later episode in the first season.
 The novel has been adapted into an eight-issue comic book mini-series, adapted by Mark Powers and illustrated by Ardian Syaf and Brett Booth.

References

External links

 The first two chapters of the book and several MP3 clips are on the author's official website.
 Review by J. K. Pelletier, FantasyBookNews.com, October 2009

2000 American novels
American fantasy novels
Novels by Jim Butcher
The Dresden Files
Low fantasy novels
Urban fantasy novels
2000 graphic novels